A strain energy density function or stored energy density function is a scalar-valued function that relates the strain energy density of a material to the deformation gradient.

Equivalently,

where  is the (two-point) deformation gradient tensor,  is the right Cauchy–Green deformation tensor,  is the left Cauchy–Green deformation tensor,

For an anisotropic material, the strain energy density function  depends implicitly on reference vectors or tensors (such as the initial orientation of fibers in a composite) that characterize internal material texture. The spatial representation,  must further depend explicitly on the polar rotation tensor  to provide sufficient information to convect the reference texture vectors or tensors into the spatial configuration. 

In other words, the strain energy density function can be expressed uniquely in terms of the principal stretches or in terms of the invariants of the left Cauchy–Green deformation tensor or right Cauchy–Green deformation tensor and we have:

For isotropic materials,

with

For linear isotropic materials undergoing small strains, the strain energy density function specializes to

For an isotropic hyperelastic material, the function relates the energy stored in an elastic material, and thus the stress–strain relationship, only to the three strain (elongation) components, thus disregarding the deformation history, heat dissipation, stress relaxation etc. 

For isothermal elastic processes, the strain energy density function relates to the specific Helmholtz free energy function ,

For isentropic elastic processes, the strain energy density function relates to the internal energy function ,

Examples 
Some examples of hyperelastic constitutive equations are:
Saint Venant–Kirchhoff
Neo-Hookean
Generalized Rivlin
Mooney–Rivlin
Ogden
Yeoh
Arruda–Boyce model
Gent

See also 

Finite strain theory
Helmholtz and Gibbs free energy in thermoelasticity
Hyperelastic material
Ogden–Roxburgh model

References 

Continuum mechanics
Rubber properties
Solid mechanics

ja:ひずみエネルギー